Phyllonorycter gozmanyi is a moth of the family Gracillariidae. It is known from Cameroon. The habitat consists of savannah.

The length of the forewings is about 3.1 mm for males and 2.9-3.3 mm for females. Adults are on wing at the end of November and early December.

Etymology
The name of this species is derived from the family name of the late Hungarian lepidopterist Laszlo Antal Gozmany who celebrated his 85th anniversary in 2006. He studied African Tineidae, among several other groups of Lepidoptera.

References

Endemic fauna of Cameroon
Moths described in 2007
gozmanyi
Insects of Cameroon
Moths of Africa